A deadly late-season tornado outbreak, the deadliest on record in December, produced catastrophic damage and numerous fatalities across portions of the Southern United States and Ohio Valley from the evening of December 10 to the early morning of December 11, 2021. The event developed as a trough progressed eastward across the United States, interacting with an unseasonably moist and unstable environment across the Mississippi Valley. Tornado activity began in northeastern Arkansas, before progressing into Missouri, Illinois, Tennessee, and Kentucky.

The most prolific activity was caused by a long-track supercell thunderstorm that produced a family of strong tornadoes that traveled across four Mid-South states. The fifth of these nocturnal tornadoes and first notable tornado of the event, rated low-end EF4, touched down in northeastern Arkansas, near Jonesboro, before causing major damage in and near towns such as Monette and Leachville, Arkansas. It crossed the Missouri Bootheel, causing additional damage and fatalities near Braggadocio and Hayti. After crossing the Mississippi River into northwestern West Tennessee, that tornado dissipated, and a high-end EF4 tornado formed and moved through Western Kentucky, where the towns of Cayce, Mayfield, Benton, Princeton, Dawson Springs, and Bremen suffered severe to catastrophic damage.

If it had been a single tornado, it would have surpassed the March 18, 1925, tornado event (which carved a  path across Missouri, Illinois, and Indiana) in terms of path length. However, storm surveys found that the path was predominantly composed of two distinct EF4 tornadoes, with the portion of the path between them over northwestern Obion County, Tennessee being from three separate, weak tornadoes. The parent supercell that produced the two EF4 tornadoes, and eleven tornadoes in total, later became known as the "Quad-State supercell". Other tornadic thunderstorms affected portions of eastern Missouri, Southern Illinois, West and Middle Tennessee, and Western and central Kentucky during the late evening into the overnight hours of December 11, including four intense tornadoes that hit Bowling Green, Kentucky; Dresden, Tennessee; Edwardsville, Illinois; and Defiance, Missouri.

The death toll from the outbreak was 89 (with six additional non-tornadic fatalities), surpassing the Tornado outbreak sequence of December 1–6, 1953, which caused 49 fatalities, as the deadliest December tornado event ever recorded in the United States. In Kentucky alone, 74 people were killed by three separate tornadoes. In addition, at least 667 people were injured. The tornado outbreak caused at least $3.9 billion (2022 USD) in damages. The outbreak set a new record for confirmed tornadoes in the month of December, with 71, a record that only stood until December 15, when a larger outbreak produced 120 tornadoes across the Midwest.

Meteorological synopsis
 
On December 8, the Storm Prediction Center (SPC) delineated a slight risk of severe weather along much of the Mississippi Valley. Despite the potential for a higher-end severe threat to materialize, forecasters expressed uncertainty regarding the extent of instability, degree of directional wind shear, and late timing of potential storms. The following day, the SPC discussed higher certainty in a corridor of organized severe thunderstorm potential stretching from southeastern Arkansas northeast into southern Indiana, upgrading that region to an enhanced risk.

As an intense upper-level trough progressed across the High Plains, with robust instability and moisture return realized across the Mississippi Valley, the SPC expanded the enhanced risk and introduced a moderate risk area from northeastern Arkansas into southern Illinois on the morning of December 10. Forecasters indicated that atmospheric conditions favored the development of nocturnal supercells capable of producing long-tracked, strong tornadoes.

At 3:00 p.m. CST (21:00 UTC), the SPC issued a tornado watch across the highest risk area (encompassing central and eastern Arkansas, west Tennessee, northwestern Mississippi, southeastern Missouri, and southern portions of Illinois and Indiana), the first of eleven issued over subsequent hours over the middle Mississippi Valley. Initial storms developed across central Arkansas around 2:00 p.m. CST (20:00 UTC), with even weaker activity developing over central Missouri a little over  hours later; additional clusters of thunderstorms developed over southwestern Missouri (forming between Bolivar and Carthage, eventually back-building into northeastern Oklahoma) and central Arkansas (forming southwest of Hot Springs) between 5:00 and 5:30 p.m. CST (23:00–23:30 UTC). Though this activity lacked much vigor at its onset due to a strong capping inversion, the convective cells began to show organization as they progressed eastward.

The cell began exhibiting surface-based rotation southwest of Searcy, Arkansas around 5:30 p.m. CST (23:30 UTC). At 5:51 p.m. CST, the National Weather Service office in North Little Rock issued the first tornado warning associated with the storm for portions of Jackson, Lawrence, White, and Woodruff counties. One of the first tornadoes associated with the storm, an EF0, touched down in western Poinsett County (near Weiner) around 6:40 p.m. CST; about fifteen minutes later, storm spotters reported a large tornado near Greenfield, prompting a PDS tornado warning for portions of Poinsett, Craighead and Mississippi counties (including areas to the south of Jonesboro).

CST [02:44–3:01 UTC], as the storm crossed from Obion County, Tennessee into Hickman County, Kentucky). This time frame coincides with the start of the main tornado, following three weak tornadoes that split the two EF4's paths, implying the supercell underwent a mesocyclone re-strengthening phase during this period. CST (04:58 UTC) over northeastern Marshall County, Kentucky.

Elsewhere, multiple lines of intense storms, some featuring embedded supercells, developed across the Mississippi Valley region through the overnight hours, contributing to additional strong and long-lived tornadoes. By the pre-dawn hours of December 11, a decrease in instability led to a gradual weakening of a line of thunderstorms stretching along the associated cold front from eastern Kentucky southward into central Alabama.

The SPC issued a record-setting 43 mesoscale discussions (MCD) throughout the course of the day (12 UTC December 10 to 12 UTC December 11), all of which were associated with the broader storm system: 38 of the MCDs issued were convective discussions relating to the severe thunderstorm activity, and five were non-convective discussions relating to heavy snow associated with the system that concurrently fell throughout much of the Upper Midwest. The National Weather Service (NWS) issued a total of 149 tornado warnings throughout the night across portions of nine states including Arkansas, Tennessee, Missouri, Mississippi, Kentucky, Illinois, and Indiana.

Multiple PDS tornado warnings and tornado emergencies were also issued as well in Arkansas, Tennessee, Kentucky, and Missouri. Eight of the tornado warnings issued during the event by the NWS offices in Memphis, Tennessee, and Paducah, Kentucky were tornado emergency declarations, the most issued during the month of December (breaking the previous record of three issued on December 23, 2015).

Effects from the system responsible for the outbreak extended into Canada, where the Meteorological Service of Canada issued wind and heavy rainfall warnings for portions of Ontario. However, no tornadoes were expected nor reported north of the border.

Confirmed tornadoes

December 10 event

December 11 event

Monette-Leachville, AR/Braggodocio, Missouri/Reelfoot Lake—Tiptonville-Samburg, Tennessee

This violent, long-tracked, and deadly EF4 wedge tornado was the fifth of eleven spawned by the Quad-State supercell, and the first of two violent tornadoes produced by the storm. It first touched down in Craighead County, Arkansas, just north of Bay, at 7:07 p.m. CST (01:07 UTC) on the evening of December 10, initially causing minor EF0 tree and outbuilding damage. As it moved through the south side of Bowman, it caused EF0 to EF1 damage as roofs were damaged, power poles and tree limbs were downed, and a radio antennae at a residence was bent. The tornado quickly intensified to EF2 strength as it crossed AR 18 and passed northwest of Lake City, downing trees and damaging or destroying some metal outbuildings. A house also sustained minor damage in this area. Another house sustained major roof damage in this area, an irrigation pivot sprinkler was overturned, and a silo was damaged. The tornado reached EF3 strength as it moved through the western and northern fringes of Monette at 7:23 p.m. CST (01:23 UTC), resulting in significant damage. Two industrial buildings were destroyed at the west edge of town, and many trees and power poles were snapped. The Monette Manor nursing home was struck by the tornado, killing one person and trapping 20 other residents and employees. The building sustained major structural damage, losing much of its roof and sustaining collapse of some masonry exterior walls. Multiple homes and mobile homes were damaged or destroyed in a neighborhood near the nursing home, and several large grain silos were torn apart. In addition to the fatality, five people were reported seriously injured in Monette. State Highways 135 and 139 were also shut down near the town due to downed power lines on the roadways.

The tornado continued at EF3 intensity as it crossed into northwestern Mississippi County, striking Leachville at 7:30 p.m. CST (01:30 UTC). There, it completely destroyed a local Dollar General store, killing the store's assistant manager. A few metal-framed warehouse buildings were badly damaged or destroyed nearby, cars and semi-trailers were tossed, and multiple homes and mobile homes were damaged or destroyed in town. Extensive tree damage also occurred, and businesses in downtown Leachville had roofing blown off. The tornado grew larger as it passed near the rural community of Buckeye, and very intense tree damage was noted along West County Road 38. An entire row of large trees were completely debarked and denuded at this location, and an EF3 rating was applied. Power poles were snapped and an outbuilding was also destroyed by the tornado in this area. As it crossed the state line into Dunklin County in the Missouri Bootheel at 7:40 p.m. CST (01:40 UTC), high-end EF2 damage occurred as multiple outbuildings, mobile homes, and houses were damaged or destroyed, and many power poles and trees were snapped, with some low-end debarking noted. It continued south of Hornersville and over the Hornersville Swamp Conservation Area, briefly weakening to EF1 intensity. Trees and power poles were damaged in this area, and a mobile home also sustained minor damage. Farther to the northeast, the damage became more severe again as multiple metal truss transmission towers were twisted or collapsed near County Road 722, and damage in this area was rated EF3. A house along the periphery of the circulation sustained minor damage, and some power poles were pushed over as well. High-end EF2 damage occurred as the tornado then crossed into Pemiscot County west of Steele. Trees were snapped and denuded, power poles were downed, a couple of homes were heavily damaged, and a pickup truck was tossed along this segment of the path. The tornado became weak again as it passed just south of Braggadocio at EF1 intensity, damaging or destroying some barns and outbuildings, and inflicting roof damage to homes. However, the tornado abruptly became violent as it moved through the intersection of State Highway J and County Highway 407 to the east of town, causing EF4 damage as two homes were swept from their foundations and scattered across fields. A nine-year-old girl was killed, and her parents and two younger sisters were injured in the destruction of one of the homes. As it crossed Interstate 55 just south of Hayti, the large wedge tornado weakened back to EF2 strength and blew multiple semi-trailer trucks off the highway into a field, injuring the drivers. A car was also thrown, fatally injuring the driver. In addition to the two fatalities, at least nine people overall were injured in the county.

East of Hayti, the tornado caused additional EF2 power pole damage and then crossed the Mississippi River into Lake County, Tennessee around 8:20 p.m. CST (02:20 UTC). It briefly crossed a bend in the river back into Missouri before crossing into Lake County again. Moving through central Lake County, the tornado narrowly missed the small community of Wynnburg, producing EF3 damage in rural areas outside of town, where numerous large trees were snapped and denuded, some of which sustained debarking. Some metal high-tension power poles were bent to the ground as well. The tornado reached peak intensity a second time near Tiptonville as it moved across the southern shore of Reelfoot Lake, striking the Cypress Point Resort and resulting in three fatalities. A bait and tackle shop sustained EF4 damage as it was swept clean from its foundation, with only a bare concrete slab remaining. Multiple cottages, houses, and cabins were also destroyed, while a couple of two-story hotel buildings sustained total destruction of their top floors, and collapse of many walls on their first floors, with damage to those structures rated EF3. A gift shop and a restaurant also sustained severe damage, large amounts of debris was scattered throughout the area, and several people sustained serious injuries at the resort. The tornado crossed the southeastern part of the lake, before moving ashore again as it entered Obion County, causing high-end EF2 damage as it damaged or destroyed cabins, outbuildings, and houses along Lake Drive. Continuing at high-end EF2 strength, the tornado narrowed as it impacted the small town of Samburg, resulting in major damage along Highway 22. Houses in town had roofs and exterior walls ripped off, RV campers were tossed, and mobile homes were destroyed. The city hall building, post office, a gas station, and several other buildings were damaged or destroyed as well. One person was killed in town, and others were injured. Northeast of town, the tornado began to weaken, with the roof being blown off a farm building along Old Samburg Road. Trees and tree limbs were also downed, and damage was rated EF1 in this area. CST (02:36 UTC).

Eight fatalities occurred, along with many injuries, some of which were serious. After the tornado dissipated, the parent supercell entered a cycling phase, producing three brief tornadoes, one rated EF1 and the other two rated EF0, in Obion County northeast of Samburg and west of Union City. As the storm passed to the northwest of Union City, it produced a stronger, longer-tracked tornado near Woodland Mills.

Edwardsville, Illinois 

A tornado touched down northeast of Pontoon Beach in Madison County, Illinois, on the northwest side of the intersection of Interstates 255 and 270, at 8:27 p.m. CST (02:27 UTC) on the evening of December 10. The tornado was initially weak, with damage at the beginning of the path being limited to downed highway signs, a bent light pole, and some orange construction barrels that were tossed around. Damage in this area was rated EF0 to EF1. It struck an Amazon warehouse along Chain Of Rocks Road, where night workers were beginning their shifts and several employees were attending a Christmas party being held as the tornado approached the facility. Six people were killed when the roof was lifted off the building, and the west-facing walls of the structure collapsed inward, causing a progressive structural failure that resulted in total destruction of most of the warehouse. Employees were told to shelter in bathrooms.

Between 50 and 100 people were trapped in the collapsed remnants of the warehouse, and about 30 survivors were brought to the Pontoon Beach police station in a bus after being extracted from the rubble. One person was air-flown via helicopter to a hospital. Debris from the structure was strewn downwind, cars were thrown from the parking lot, and multiple power poles and metal truss transmission towers were downed nearby. The tornado weakened to high-end EF1 intensity as it crossed Sand Road, snapping trees and completely destroying some outbuildings and an unanchored mobile home. As it entered the southwest side of Edwardsville, the tornado moved through the Sunset Hills Golf and Country Club, causing EF1 damage as trees and power lines were downed, homes sustained roof damage, and sheds were damaged or destroyed. EF0 damage occurred in neighborhoods just beyond this point, with minor tree and roof damage noted. The tornado dissipated near the corner of Doral Court and Butler Boulevard at 8:35 p.m. In addition to the six fatalities, one other person was injured.

Mayfield–Princeton–Dawson Springs–Bremen, Kentucky

After the first long-tracked EF4 tornado dissipated over western Obion County, Tennessee, the associated supercell underwent a brief mesocyclone cycling phase, producing three weak, short-lived tornadoes. Minutes later, it spawned a new long-tracked violent tornado in northern Obion County near Woodland Mills at 8:49 p.m. CST (02:49 UTC). The tornado crossed into Kentucky near the community of State Line and rapidly intensified to EF4 strength as it struck Cayce at about 9:00 p.m. CST (03:00 UTC), where major damage occurred to homes, businesses, a school building, and the town's fire station. A few buildings were leveled or swept away. One person was killed in the town, and others were injured. It then moved northeast through rural areas in Fulton and Hickman counties, causing deep scouring of the ground in open fields. Homes and outbuildings were damaged or destroyed, a cell tower was toppled to the ground, and damage in these areas was rated EF2 to EF3.

 
Closely paralleling Purchase Parkway (Future I-69) and US 45 into Graves County, the tornado moved directly toward Mayfield, entering the southwestern portion of the city at 9:25 p.m. CST as it reached EF4 intensity. One minute later, at 9:26 p.m. CST, the National Weather Service office in Paducah issued a tornado emergency for Mayfield. Radar analysis indicated that debris had been lofted up to  into the tornado as it struck the town. Catastrophic damage occurred as the violent tornado tore directly through the Mayfield Downtown Commercial District at high-end EF4 intensity, where numerous large, well-built brick buildings were destroyed, many of which completely collapsed with only piles of rubble remaining. Three large churches were destroyed, and the Graves County Courthouse lost much of its roof, had its clock tower torn off, and had some of its exterior upper-floor walls knocked down. The fire station, city hall, and police station in the city were also destroyed, and the water tower was blown over and smashed to pieces. Entire neighborhoods were destroyed, with numerous homes being leveled or swept from their foundations, and cars were thrown and mangled. Hundreds of large trees were snapped, denuded, and debarked throughout Mayfield, numerous power lines were downed, and the town's emergency operations center lost the ability to transmit radio communications. About 110 people were left trapped at the Mayfield Consumer Products candle factory when the tornado hit the facility, completely flattening the building to the ground and tossing industrial vehicles. A total of 8 employees were killed, and several others were injured. Allegedly, workers' jobs were threatened if they left the factory between the first and second tornado warnings for the area, and then again after the second tornado warning sounded. The deaths of the workers at the candle factory prompted the launch of an investigation into the facility's protocols by state authorities. Kentucky Governor Andy Beshear stated that over 50 people died in the city during a live phone interview with Louisville CBS affiliate WLKY on December 11. However, it was later determined that a total of 22 people were killed in Mayfield, and many others were injured.

The tornado's projected path towards several towns prompted the National Weather Service's Paducah office to issue additional tornado emergencies over the next two hours as the tornado tracked to the northeast, devastating multiple small towns and communities. Continuing northeast along I-69 into Marshall County, it continued to produce major damage as it struck the northwestern and northern outskirts of Benton around 9:45 p.m., damaging and destroying numerous homes and outbuildings at EF2 to EF3 strength, and downing countless trees and power poles. Continuing to the northeast, EF4 damage occurred in the lakeshore community of Cambridge Shores at 9:56 p.m. Dozens of large lakeside homes were leveled or swept away, and hundreds of trees were mowed down and debarked. After passing over Lake Barkley and destroying more homes in that area, the tornado moved into Caldwell County through the south edge of Princeton, producing EF4 damage. Many houses were completely leveled at the Princeton Golf and Country Club Subdivision, the University of Kentucky Research Center was destroyed, and four fatalities occurred in the Princeton area. EF4 damage continued as it moved into Dawson Springs around 10:30 p.m. CST. The small town was devastated by the tornado, and residential sections of town were the hardest-hit, as entire blocks of homes were flattened and reduced to rubble. An American Legion post was leveled, an apartment complex was destroyed, vehicles were thrown and piled on top of each other, and multiple large industrial warehouses were completely destroyed as the tornado exited town. A total of 14 people died from the tornado in Dawson Springs, including a two-month-old baby who was taken off life support two days after the tornado hit. A photograph taken in 1942 was lofted from a destroyed house in Dawson Springs and transported for almost  by the intense tornadic updrafts, eventually being found in New Albany, Indiana.

In the small community of Barnsley, just south of Earlington, the tornado derailed a CSX freight train, knocking over 25 of the train's freight cars, some of which were thrown from the tracks. One freight car was tossed into a house, and many other homes were completely destroyed in and around Barnsley, and damage was rated high-end EF3. The tornado then intensified dramatically as it struck Bremen, where multiple homes were obliterated and swept away at high-end EF4 strength in the northern part of town. Large trees were completely stripped of their limbs and debarked, grass was scoured from the ground, and cars were lofted through the air and severely mangled in this area. A total of 11 people were killed in and around Bremen, with victims ranging between the ages of 5 months and 75 years. Among the fatalities was District Judge Brian Crick, who represented both Muhlenberg and McLean counties, as confirmed in a statement from the Supreme Court of Kentucky on December 11. Multiple residents suffered injuries that required medical attention.

Crossing into Ohio County, the tornado passed just north of Centertown and Hartford, crossing US 231, I-165 and the Rough River. EF2 to EF3 damage occurred in this area as multiple houses sustained major structural damage or were destroyed, metal power poles were snapped, mobile homes were obliterated, and many large trees were snapped and twisted. Large hay bales, RV campers, and tractors were thrown along this segment of the path as well. The tornado crossed the Rough River a total of eleven times in Ohio, Grayson and Breckinridge counties, producing EF1 to EF2 damage to many structures, and downing countless trees along its northeastward track. After crossing the river for a final time northeast of Falls of Rough, it re-entered Grayson County and dissipated at 11:47 p.m.

Kenton–Dresden, Tennessee/Pembroke, Kentucky 
 
This intense, long-tracked tornado first touched down in the northeastern part of Newbern in Dyer County, Tennessee at 10:32 p.m. CST and quickly intensified as it moved northeastward at EF2 strength. Several homes suffered significant damage to their roofs and garages, and some houses had carports ripped off. Many trees were snapped or uprooted, and power lines were downed. The most significant damage in Newbern occurred along Washington Street, where a gas station was destroyed. The metal canopy over the gas pumps was blown away, and the convenience store was completely destroyed, leaving two people trapped inside who had to be extracted from the rubble. A detached garage was also destroyed with the debris scattered downwind, and an elementary school and a vocational school also sustained damage. Exiting Newbern and moving to the northeast, the tornado weakened to EF1 intensity and crossed into Gibson County, where tree damage occurred and a house along Cool Springs Road had part of its roof blown off. As it crossed Baseline Road, it ripped roofing material and a screened-in patio off of a house, and blew in one of its exterior walls. Trees and power poles were snapped in this area, and damage was rated low-end EF2. As it crossed Morella Road farther to the northeast, it produced EF3 damage as a house was destroyed and left with only interior rooms standing. A nearby three-story home had its top floor blown off, another house was unroofed and pushed off of its foundation, and the damage to those two residences was rated EF2.

The strong tornado then struck Kenton, causing severe damage as it moved through residential areas in the southern part of town. Numerous homes had their roofs torn off and were heavily damaged, and a majority of the damage in Kenton was rated EF2. However, one house along South Poplar Street had its roof removed and exterior walls collapsed, earning an EF3 rating. Sheds and detached garages were destroyed, and many large trees were snapped or uprooted in town, some of which landed on houses. It then weakened and clipped the southeast corner of Obion County, before entering Weakley County and passing north of Sharon. EF1 damage to trees and structures was noted along this portion of the path. Past Sharon, the tornado began to strengthen again, reaching EF2 strength as it partially destroyed a one-story home near the corner of SR 89 and Macedonia Church Road. High-end EF2 damage occurred along Deer Run Drive as the tornado followed Tennessee State Route 89 to the northeast. Homes in this area sustained loss of their roofs and upper-floor exterior walls, and one house had its entire second story blown away and destroyed. The tornado then reached high-end EF3 intensity and caused major damage as it tore directly though Dresden. The downtown section of Dresden was severely damaged, and multiple brick businesses sustained major structural damage, a few of which were completely destroyed. The First United Methodist Church, the Dresden Fire Department, the Dresden Enterprise newspaper office, a market, a hardware store, restaurants, convenience stores, two automotive repair shops, and other buildings all sustained significant damage or were destroyed. Some metal-framed buildings were also destroyed, and the Weakley County Courthouse sustained some minor damage to its exterior. Vehicles were flipped and tossed and numerous homes were damaged or destroyed, including a couple of small homes that were leveled or swept from their foundations. Many large trees were snapped, denuded, or uprooted throughout Dresden, and debris from buildings was left scattered throughout the town, with some left tangled in power lines or wrapped around trees. At least one person was injured, and approximately 100 structures were badly damaged or destroyed in town. The tornado then weakened again and continued to the northeast, causing EF1 tree damage in rural areas of Weakley County.

The tornado then moved into Henry County and continued south of Cottage Grove at EF3 intensity. It produced severe damage along Cox Road and Veasey Road, where it tore the second story off a two-story home, while leaving another nearby house with only interior walls standing. A mobile home was also thrown across a road and destroyed in this area. Farther northeast, EF3 damage continued as a well-built brick home along Blake School Road was completely shifted off of its foundation, with its deck destroyed and several walls knocked down. Several other homes along this part of the path sustained partial to total roof loss, trees were downed, while grain silos and a number of outbuildings were destroyed. The tornado then weakened as it crossed US 641, and a building sustained EF1 roof damage in this area. The tornado began to strengthen again as it moved through rural areas to the southeast of Puryear, and EF2 damage occurred along Old Paris Murray Road, where a cabin and a barn were destroyed. A mobile home was destroyed, another mobile home was damaged by falling trees, and a house had shingles ripped off along this segment of the path as well, and damage to those structures was rated EF1. Further strengthening occurred and high-end EF2 damage was noted near Buchanan, as homes along SR 140 sustained roof and exterior wall loss, and debris was scattered into fields. Other homes in this area were damaged to a lesser degree, and many trees were downed, with damage in those areas rated EF1.  The tornado continued to the northeast past Oak Hill and through the small community of Cypress Creek near the western shore of Kentucky Lake. Numerous homes sustained considerable roof damage in Cypress Creek, and hundreds of trees were downed, some of which landed on houses. Some mobile homes were damaged or destroyed as well, and damage along this section of the path was rated EF1 to EF2. Five people were injured in Henry County. Weakening to EF0 strength, the tornado clipped the Fort Donelson National Battlefield in the extreme southeast corner of Calloway County, Kentucky, knocking down some trees. It then moved across Kentucky Lake and into Stewart County, Tennessee. Moving through the Tennessee portion of the Land Between the Lakes National Recreation Area, the tornado intensified again and downed thousands of trees. It caused EF2 damage as it passed to the south of Bumpus Mills, where a well-built brick home had its roof and second story torn off. Farm outbuildings were also destroyed, a few barns and single-wide trailers were flattened, and other single-wide and double-wide mobile homes had their roofs lifted off. Four people were injured in Stewart County. The tornado continued northeast across the far northwest corner of Fort Campbell Army Base, continuing to blow down trees before entering Christian County, Kentucky.

Passing just south of Lafayette, Kentucky, two large barns were destroyed, several electrical transmission lines and many trees were knocked down, a house along Old Clarksville Pike sustained roof damage, and damage near Lafayette was rated EF2. Maintaining EF2 intensity, the tornado moved over mostly open country before causing significant damage to several homes on Boddie Road and Darnell Road to the south of Herndon. A church sustained damage to its roof and steeple in this area, while silos and irrigation pivot sprinklers were destroyed as well. On Palmyra Road, EF2 damage continued to occur as several homes, farm outbuildings, and other structures were badly damaged or destroyed. Farther to the northeast, a mobile home was completely demolished, trees and power poles were snapped, barns were destroyed, a house had its roof torn off, while other homes sustained roof and garage damage near Herndon Oak Grove Road, and damage was again rated EF2. Maintaining its strength, the tornado approached I-24, where numerous trees were snapped or uprooted, a garage was destroyed, and some houses sustained roof damage. Along Fort Campbell Blvd (US 41A), EF1 to EF2 damage occurred as a mile-wide swath of wooden power poles was snapped, a tall silo was blown over, many trees were downed, a house had damage to its roof, and barns were destroyed. The tornado then inflicted EF2 damage to a tobacco farm along Bradshaw Road, causing millions of dollars in damage. Four tobacco barns, three equipment garages, and multiple silos were destroyed on the property, while two outbuildings were damaged and a house sustained roof damage as well. Continuing to the northeast at EF2 strength, the tornado struck the town of Pembroke directly, where numerous large trees were snapped or uprooted, and multiple homes sustained considerable roof damage, including two houses that had their roofs torn off along Mason Lane at the south edge of town. Garages, grain silos, and outbuilding structures were damaged or destroyed in town, and Pembroke Elementary School had much of its roof blown off. Some brick buildings in downtown Pembroke were also heavily damaged, including a church that had its steeple torn off. As the tornado exited town and moved to the northeast, two mobile homes were completely destroyed at low-end EF2 strength, injuring the occupants. Crossing into Todd County, the tornado weakened to EF1 intensity and damaged more outbuildings and downed more trees. A large two-story house along Maton Road sustained broken windows and had minor roof damage. Some additional EF1 tree damage occurred just beyond this point before the tornado dissipated at Tress Shop Road west of Elkton at 12:36 a.m. CST (06:36 UTC), with straight-line winds becoming dominant beyond this point. Despite the severe damage in multiple areas along the path, no fatalities occurred, although 13 people were injured.

Bowling Green, Kentucky

First tornado

After the Logan County EF3 tornado lifted, the same supercell produced this intense, destructive, and deadly tornado at around 1:09 a.m. CST (07:09 UTC) on December 11 in Warren County, southwest of Bowling Green. It first touched down south of the intersection of Wimpee Smith Road and Petros Browning Road, where EF0 tree damage occurred. Near Tommy Smith Road, the tornado quickly began to strengthen and reached EF2 intensity. Many trees were downed, a  horse trailer was thrown  into a ravine, while multiple barns and farm buildings were completely destroyed in this area. Just northeast of this point, high-end EF2 damage occurred as the tornado crossed KY 1083, where multiple homes and outbuildings were damaged or destroyed. This included one house that sustained complete removal of its roof and exterior walls, and was left with only an interior hallway standing. Based on scouring of corn stubble in fields, and analysis of damage patterns visible in aerial drone video taken in this area, damage surveyors determined that the tornado displayed an unusual internal structure during this initial portion of its path. There appeared to be a smaller circulation that produced an intense, narrow path of damage embedded within a broader, weaker circulation that caused less intense damage. The tornado weakened to EF1 strength as it crossed Van Meter Road and Fuqua Road, but continued to cause extensive tree damage. A one-story home also sustained minor roof damage along Fuqua Road. Additional EF1 damage occurred as it crossed LC Carr Road and Blue Level Road, where some barns and outbuildings were damaged, homes sustained siding and gutter damage, and trees were snapped. The Zomi Agape church sustained considerable roof damage, and insulation from the building was strewn in all directions. As the tornado began to enter the western fringes of Bowling Green, it rapidly intensified and became strong again as it produced EF3 damage to homes along Rembrandt Court. Nearby, the tornado moved across Old Tramm Road and Powell Street, where some one-story homes and duplexes were destroyed, a couple of which were leveled or swept clean from their foundations. However, it was noted that a large storage building was destroyed across the street from these residences, and pieces of heavy equipment were thrown into them. Damage surveyors determined that the extent of the destruction noted at the homes and duplexes was more due to heavy debris impacts, rather than extreme winds, and a rating of high-end EF2 was applied in this area as a result. It then crossed the Interstate 165 into more densely-populated areas of the city as an EF3 tornado. By this time, during live severe weather coverage on ABC/Fox affiliate WBKO; the station's tower camera was pointed toward the western sections of Bowling Green as the tornado approached. It captured a massive power failure in that part of the city as several transmission lines were knocked down by the tornado, before the station's studio facility (located along US 68/KY 80 and I-165) briefly lost electricity.

After crossing the interstate, the rapidly-intensifying tornado struck the Creekwood subdivision, where devastating damage occurred as numerous homes were completely destroyed. Some of the worst damage in the subdivision occurred along Moss Creek Avenue, where dozens of homes were leveled or swept from their foundations. Damage surveyors noted that these homes were built on poorly-constructed cinder block foundations, and damage in this area was rated high-end EF3. Dozens of cars were flipped, severely damaged, and thrown into homes, and wooden 2x4s were impaled into the ground and through vehicles. Many other homes along this segment of the path sustained major structural damage, sustaining loss of roofs and exterior walls, while large trees were snapped, twisted and denuded. Numerous fatalities occurred in the Creekwood subdivision, including an entire family of 7 that was killed in the destruction of their home. Just east of this area, the tornado crossed Spring Creek Avenue and weakened to high-end EF2 strength as it moved through another residential area. Many homes had their roofs torn off in this area, and some sustained collapse of exterior walls and were pushed off of their foundations. A two-story apartment building on Hillridge Court had its roof and many top floor exterior walls torn off, and numerous trees and power poles were snapped. Some townhouses were severely damaged near the Veterans Memorial Parkway, one of which was shifted off its foundation as well. High-end EF2 damage continued as it widened and crossed Russellville Road, damaging or destroying numerous businesses on both sides of the road. A plumbing supply company was destroyed, with the garage portion of the business blown in and collapsed. Some semi-trucks were flipped and severely damaged nearby, and a metal billboard was twisted and destroyed. A car rental business, a Marathon gas station, and some other buildings were also destroyed, while a Sonic Drive-In, Royal Motor Cars, two auto parts stores, a Shell gas station, and a Mexican restaurant were badly damaged. Trees and power poles were snapped, a dumpster was thrown , and metal light poles were bent to the ground. Multiple homes in the nearby Springhill and Crestmoor subdivisions had roofs and attached garages ripped off, and large trees were uprooted.

The tornado narrowed and weakened some as it moved through the Chuck Crume Nature Park, and into neighborhoods near Cedar Ridge Road as a low-end EF2. Damage to homes in this area was less severe, but numerous large hardwood trees were snapped and uprooted, some of which fell on houses and vehicles. A metal power pole was also toppled to the ground. It then clipped the south edge of the Western Kentucky University campus, where the buildings were not directly hit by tornadic winds, but debris was found speared into the exterior walls of a few structures. The tornado increased in intensity again as it moved along the U.S. 31W Bypass just south of downtown Bowling Green, heavily damaging or destroying several businesses at high-end EF2 to EF3 strength. An equipment rental business sustained some of the most intense damage in this area, sustaining roof loss and collapse of multiple brick exterior walls. A liquor store and a smoke shop were destroyed, while a boba tea lounge, a strip mall, and an automotive business were heavily damaged. A couple of two-story apartment buildings had severe roof damage, one of which was struck by debris from a nearby gas station. A truck was flipped onto its side, numerous power lines were downed, and many trees were snapped, uprooted, or denuded throughout this corridor as well. Weakening back to low-end EF2 intensity, it crossed Broadway Avenue as it moved through neighborhoods surrounding Magnolia Street. Large trees were snapped or uprooted in this area, houses had their roofs and porches torn off, and a butcher shop suffered significant roof and window damage.

The tornado then crossed Collett Avenue and weakened to high-end EF1 intensity, following Nutwood Street and Covington Street to the east-northeast before moving through the Briarwood Manor and Indian Hills subdivisions. Damage along this segment of the path consisted of mainly minor to moderate damage to homes, including shattered windows, garage doors blown in, gutters torn off, and roof shingles removed. However, a few houses sustained more severe damage, with half or more of their roofs blown off. Many trees and power lines were downed, cars and garden sheds were overturned, while fencing and detached garages were destroyed. The damage path turned more to the northeast as the tornado impacted the Indian Hills Country Club golf course, where trees were damaged, snapped, and uprooted. It then crossed the Barren River and regained low-end EF2 strength as it destroyed a brick silo and inflicted considerable roof damage to some houses and apartment buildings to the south of Old Porter Pike. EF2 damage continued to the northeast of this area at the GM Corvette Assembly Plant. Large rooftop HVAC units were torn off, and extensive roof damage occurred at the plant, with metal sheeting, insulation, and other debris scattered hundreds of yards. Chain link fencing on the property was destroyed, while light poles, power poles, and road signs were blown over as well. A small security checkpoint building at the facility was totally destroyed, with large pieces of the building being thrown several hundred yards. Past the Corvette plant, the damage path turned in a more easterly direction again, and the tornado weakened back to EF1 intensity as it moved through the intersection of Bristow Road and Friendship Road. A barn and a greenhouse were destroyed within this vicinity, and power poles were downed. Houses in this area sustained mainly roof, gutter, and siding damage, though one home had a large section of its roof torn off. Shortly beyond this point, it turned sharply back to the northeast and caused additional EF1 damage as it moved across Kelly Road, where some trees were downed and an outbuilding was damaged.

The tornado then rapidly intensified again and reached peak intensity as it struck an industrial park near U.S. 68, damaging or destroying multiple large industrial buildings at high-end EF3 strength. The well-built TMS Automotive warehouse was leveled by the tornado, with large metal structural supports torn from their anchor plates. A metal flag pole near one business was bent to the ground, leveraging its heavy concrete footing out of the ground in the process, and some light poles were bent over as well. The tornado then weakened to EF2 strength, but continued to inflict heavy damage as it struck a Crown Verity plant; a cookware manufacturer, near the north side of U.S. 68. The building sustained major damage, with large amounts of metal debris strewn through nearby fields. EF1 damage was noted along Mizpah Road, where fencing and trees were downed, a flag pole was bent, and some additional industrial buildings had damage to their exteriors, with metal siding and insulation scattered across fields. A house had the top part of its brick chimney blown off in this area too. It caused one more area of EF2 damage as it approached U.S. 31W, completely destroying an outbuilding along Freeport Road and blowing the debris  downwind. A house and another outbuilding sustained less severe damage nearby, and some trees were snapped. The tornado then weakened to EF1 intensity and crossed Oakland Road, moving through the small community of Tuckertown, where houses sustained roof damage, an outbuilding collapsed, some other outbuildings and silos were damaged, and trees were downed. It followed U.S. 31W to the northeast, causing more EF1 damage to trees, barns, and the roofs of homes. EF1 damage continued into Edmonson County, where trees were downed near the Dripping Springs community. The tornado then lifted and dissipated at 1:38 a.m. CST (07:38 UTC) near Cedar Springs, after causing one final area of EF1-strength tree damage along KY 259. In total, 16 people were killed and 63 people were injured by this tornado.

Second tornado

As the EF3 tornado moved through areas just south of downtown Bowling Green, a second tornado formed as a result of a separate, smaller circulation within the same parent supercell. It first touched in the southeastern part of Bowling Green at 1:19 a.m. CST (07:19 UTC), near the Bowling Green–Warren County Regional Airport. It first damaged a small metal storage building along Searcy Way, then caused significant roof damage to a well-built airplane hangar as it moved across the airport grounds. Damage along this initial part of the path was rated EF1. An anemometer at the airport recorded an  wind gust as the tornado passed by, though it was not directly hit by the tornado. The tornado continued at high-end EF1 strength as it moved to the northeast, parallel to Interstate 65. These structures sustained extensive roof and window damage, with garages at the complex suffering the most intense damage. Trees were also downed in this area. Additional damage to trees and roofs occurred in a neighborhood just north of Lovers Lane Park. The tornado became strong as it crossed Mount Victor Lane, where a house was heavily damaged and shifted off of its foundation, and damage to that residence was rated low-end EF2. It weakened again as it crossed the Barren River just east of the path of the main EF3 tornado, which followed moments later. Homes and apartment buildings along McFadin Station Street suffered considerable roof and siding damage, and trees and power lines were downed, with damage in this area being rated EF1. Just beyond this point, extensive tree damage occurred and a barn was destroyed near Porter Pike. The tornado then reached peak strength, producing EF2 damage as it struck NCM Motorsports Park on the south side of the interstate.

The main building, a series of automobile repair garages, and some metal storage buildings sustained extensive damage at this location, with large sections of roofing and exterior walls ripped off of the structures. Structural debris was scattered over a half-mile to the east-northeast, and several cars were moved and damaged by flying debris. The tornado weakened as it paralleled the interstate, causing EF1 damage along McGinnis Road and Bristow Road. An unanchored mobile home was destroyed, numerous trees were downed, and siding, gutter, and roofing damage was observed at several homes along this segment of the path. Just beyond this point, the tornado caused some additional EF0 tree damage before it dissipated near mile marker 29.2 along I-65 at 1:24 a.m. CST (07:24 UTC), southeast of Plum Springs, after traveling .

Non-tornadic effects 

The initial winter storm, unofficially referred to by The Weather Channel (TWC) as Winter Storm Atticus, entered the Western United States on December 9. The storm brought the first measurable snowfall of the rainy season to Utah.

Minneapolis and St. Paul each declared snow emergencies. In the Twin Cities, Metro Transit reported that half of its busses were delayed. More than 250 flights were canceled at Minneapolis–Saint Paul International Airport. Near Faribault, a seven-car pileup occurred on Interstate 35. Minnesota State Patrol reported 232 crashes, causing 19 injuries. The National Weather Service issued winter storm warnings for part of Minnesota during the December 10.

In South Dakota, Sioux Falls issued a snow alert. The Lincoln County Sheriff's Office issued a no-travel alert. Several highways, including Interstate 229 and Interstate 90 were snow-covered. Numerous school districts around the area cancelled classes on December 10.

Nearly 200,000 customers were left without power in Michigan as the storm passed through, while more than 7,000 customers lost power in Wisconsin.

In Canada, winds gusting to 62 mph (100 km/h) uprooted trees and caused property damage and multiple power outages across Southern Ontario and the St. Lawrence River Valley. More than 300,000 customers in Ontario and Québec lost power.

New York saw over 100,000 power outages, including 41,000 in Erie County. Wind gusts in Western New York reached  and in the New York metropolitan area reached . Waves reached  along the Lake Erie coastline, forcing multiple parks to close.

Impact and aftermath

Nine states were affected by the outbreak with five states being heavily impacted; homes and businesses incurring severe damage in many communities along the path of each of the storms, many of which collapsed and were reduced to rubble. The tornadoes resulted in 88 fatalities, 75 of which occurred in Kentucky, and hundreds of injuries.

As of December 13, three days after the outbreak took place, 26,000 buildings were without power, while 10,000 were without water and an additional 17,000 were placed under boil-water advisories in Kentucky. Also in Kentucky, estimates indicated between 60,000 and over 80,000 people were without power across the state. In Trigg County, over 14,000 residents were left without power. In Taylor County, one woman was killed. Officials in the county said major damage occurred, but the extent is not known. Rescue workers said many structures were destroyed in the county. Injured individuals were transported to a nearby medical facility. Western Kentucky University canceled commencement ceremonies scheduled for December 11, due to the EF3 tornado that hit Bowling Green the previous night and caused citywide power outages affecting the campus. In Bremen, a video of a man surreptitiously recorded playing Bill Gaither's "Jesus, There's Something About That Name" on a piano in his destroyed house was shared by many people. Jason Crabb, who was from nearby Beaver Dam, invited the man, Jordan Baize, to play the song on the Grand Ole Opry on December 17.

In Bowling Green, one indirect storm-related fatality occurred, involving a man who died from a heart attack while helping clean up debris at his daughter's house; in Franklin County, a man was killed when his truck was swept into floodwaters along Benson Creek.

Local National Weather Service operations were impacted during the outbreak, forcing two offices to briefly suspend operations. The power outages caused by the storms resulted in the National Weather Service's Paducah office temporarily transferring warning responsibilities for its County Warning Area to the agency's Springfield, Missouri office, and NOAA Weather Radio stations operated by the Paducah office temporarily went off-the-air in parts of the state during the outbreak. Employees at the National Weather Service's St. Louis office, located in Weldon Spring, were forced to take shelter and temporarily suspend operations as an EF3 tornado passed just south of the facility around 7:45 p.m. CST on December 10.

In Arkansas, a semi-trailer truck overturned on the northbound lane of Interstate 555 in Poinsett County (southwest of Trumann), due to straight-line winds associated with the supercell; natural gas that was being carried inside the truck leaked onto the highway, resulting in the closure of both lanes of the highway for most of the evening.

In Indiana, damage was mostly limited to power outages from the storms and trees falling into houses and onto vehicles, with only one person being hospitalized. At least 17,000 Duke Energy customers, 12,500 AES Indiana customers, 12,500 Indiana Michigan Power Co. customers, and 1,300 South Central Indiana REMC customers lost power due to the storms.

In Tennessee, more than 130,000 people were left without power in the state as a result of the storms. TVA infrastructure was damaged in West Tennessee, resulting in power loss for all of Decatur and southern Henderson counties. Power remained out in Decatur County into the next week, resulting in the county school system being closed the whole week. A tree fell on a home in Shelby, resulting in a non-tornadic fatality.

On December 14, nine Tennessee counties were granted federal emergency assistance due to the damage from the storms: Lake, Obion, Dyer, Gibson, and Weakley counties in West Tennessee; and Cheatham, Dickson, and Stewart counties in Middle Tennessee, all of which had been heavily impacted by tornadoes, along with Decatur County, which had sustained county-wide power failure.

Rescue and recovery
Recovery efforts are currently underway, as disaster-aid and humanitarian groups, such as the American Red Cross, The Salvation Army, Adventist Community Services, and World Vision are collecting donations and traveling to or shipping relief items to affected areas to provide aid. At least 1,000 families were left homeless or had their properties severely damaged. Kentucky state parks provided free housing to those who could not go back to their homes. Up to 450 National Guard members were activated to help out with recovery in Kentucky. Several firefighters in the Crescent Township, Pennsylvania volunteer fire department are planning to travel to Mayfield on December 21 to help with cleanup, bringing donated supplies.

Companies affected
Multiple workers at the Mayfield Consumer Products candle factory that was destroyed when the long-track EF4 tornado hit Mayfield, Kentucky, alleged that supervisors told them they would be fired if they left their shifts early ahead of the storm's direct hit on the city. Company spokespeople have denied the allegations. On December 17, it was reported that multiple workers (only one was named due to fear of reprisal) filed a class-action lawsuit against the company. The lawsuit alleged that the company had up to three and a half hours to allow employees to leave before the tornado hit the factory and showed a flagrant indifference to the rights of the workers. It was later brought to light that the factory had committed 12 OSHA safety violations in 2019, for which they were forced to pay a fine of $9,810 (2019 USD); specific violations included one stating that safeguards during emergency situations must be working properly at all times, one stating that there had to be people who could perform first aid and one stating that first aid supplies need to be available. The Kentucky OSHA board is currently investigating the factory.

On December 11, Amazon founder and executive chairman Jeff Bezos issued a statement about the impact to the company's Edwardsville, Illinois, warehouse on Twitter: "The news from Edwardsville is tragic. We're heartbroken over the loss of our teammates there, and our thoughts and prayers are with their families and loved ones. All of Edwardsville should know that the Amazon team is committed to supporting them and will be by their side through this crisis. We extend our fullest gratitude to all the incredible first responders who have worked so tirelessly at the site." Bezos was criticized on social media for issuing his response to the tragedy approximately 23 hours after the tornado destroyed the warehouse, and for attending the scheduled third launch of the New Shepard 4 suborbital vehicle that morning despite the tragedy. OSHA is currently investigating the deaths at the warehouse; the warehouse has no prior violations on record.

An Amazon driver stationed at the Edwardsville base delivering packages was told she would be fired by her supervisor if she went back to the Edwardsville base upon tornado sirens going off. She had previously mentioned tornado warnings had been issued 32 minutes prior. The supervisor waited for Amazon to contact them to say what to do; at that point, she was told to shelter in place. An Amazon spokesperson later stated the supervisor did not follow standard safety protocols, specifically stating that the supervisor should have told the driver to return upon hearing tornado sirens and that they should not have threatened the driver's employment.

An Amazon employee from near Campbellsville, Kentucky, went viral on Twitter after being turned around by police and being unable to reach the warehouse for her shift due to search and rescue efforts and damage from an EF3 tornado in Taylor County. When she attempted to notify Amazon's Human Resources department about the issue she was told they had no record of tornadoes in Kentucky and penalized her. It was not until she tweeted in response to Amazon's Retail Chief Dave Clark about the issue later in the day that the issue was resolved.

Political

On December 11, U.S. President Joe Biden approved a federal emergency disaster declaration for the state of Kentucky. On December 12, he approved a major disaster declaration for Kentucky. Biden also stated that he would approve emergency declarations for other states if they submitted them, which ultimately were submitted by Tennessee and Illinois on December 13. Biden also stated that he would visit the areas affected by the storm after it was certain he was "not going to get in the way of the rescue and recovery". The White House later announced that Biden would travel to Fort Campbell on December 15, where he would be briefed on the storms, and then visit the affected communities of Mayfield and Dawson Springs. While in Dawson Springs, he stated that the damage was "beyond belief". Biden also announced that the federal disaster coverage would be upped to cover 100% (from 75%) of costs for debris removal and emergency protective measures over the next 30 days in Kentucky.

Missouri Governor Mike Parson visited both St. Charles and Pemiscot counties in the aftermath of the EF3 tornado that cut through those areas. Earlier on December 11, Governor Beshear declared a state of emergency for parts of western Kentucky. Beshear also announced the creation of a tornado relief fund and asked people to donate blood, as donated blood was running low throughout the pandemic. Kentucky Senator Mitch McConnell visited areas of Bowling Green, stating that he had not seen worse damage since the 1974 Louisville tornado.

See also

 Weather of 2021
 List of F4 and EF4 tornadoes (2020–present)
 List of United States tornadoes from October to December 2021
 List of North American tornadoes and tornado outbreaks
 List of tornadoes with confirmed satellite tornadoes
 Tri-State tornado outbreak – Another deadly tornado outbreak that produced a long-tracked tornado which crossed through three states on March 18, 1925
 1953 Vicksburg, Mississippi tornado – A deadly tornado that struck in early December
 Tornado outbreak of March 2–3, 2012 – Another outbreak that produced several deadly, long-tracked tornadoes in Kentucky
 December 2015 North American storm complex – The last time before this outbreak a violent tornado (EF4/EF5) occurred in the United States in December
 Tornado outbreak of December 16–17, 2019 – A tornado outbreak that struck the Southern United States in mid-December
 December 2021 Midwest derecho and tornado outbreak – Another historic severe weather event five days later in the Midwest which itself broke the record for most tornadoes in a single day in December

Notes

References

External links 
The December 10-11, 2021 Tornado Outbreak: A Retrospective And Analysis (YouTube video) (Interviews with Richard Thompson from SPC and Christine Wielgos from NWS Paducah)

2021 meteorology
2021 in Arkansas
2021 in Illinois
2021 in Kentucky
2021 in Missouri
2021 in Tennessee
2021 natural disasters in the United States
December 2021 events in the United States
Tornadoes in Arkansas
Tornadoes in Illinois
Tornadoes in Kentucky
Tornadoes in Missouri
Tornadoes in Tennessee
Tornadoes of 2021
Tornado outbreaks
F4 tornadoes
2021–22 North American winter